The 1967 Buffalo Bills season was the team's eighth season in the American Football League. It was the second season with the Bills for head coach Joe Collier.

Buffalo was coming off a season in which they were one game away from the first Super Bowl, but could only win four games in 1967. It was Buffalo's first losing season since 1961.

Personnel

Staff/coaches

Final roster

Offseason

1967 NFL/AFL draft

Regular season

Season schedule

Note:
Intra-division opponents are in bold text.

Game summaries

Week 14

Standings

Awards and Records

References

Buffalo Bills on Pro Football Reference
Buffalo Bills on jt-sw.com

Buffalo Bills
Buffalo Bills seasons
Buffalo